The Dangerous Coward is a 1924 American silent Western sports film directed by Albert S. Rogell and starring Fred Thomson, Hazel Keener and Frank Hagney.

Cast
 Fred Thomson as Bob Trent aka The Lightning Kid 
 Hazel Keener as Hazel McGuinn 
 Frank Hagney as Wildcat Rex 
 Andrew Arbuckle as David McGuinn 
 David Kirby as Red O'Hara 
 Al Kaufman as Battling Benson 
 Lillian Adrian as Conchita 
 Jim Corey as The Weazel

References

External links
 

1924 films
1924 Western (genre) films
1920s sports films
American black-and-white films
American boxing films
1920s English-language films
Film Booking Offices of America films
Films directed by Albert S. Rogell
Silent American Western (genre) films
1920s American films
Silent sports films